Frontier Airlines is a major ultra-low-cost U.S. airline headquartered in Denver, Colorado. It operates flights to over 100 destinations throughout the United States and 31 international destinations, and employs more than 3,000 staff. The carrier is a subsidiary and operating brand of Indigo Partners, LLC, and maintains a hub at Denver International Airport with numerous focus cities across the US.

History

1990s 

Frontier Airlines was created by Frederick W. "Rick" Brown (a United Airlines pilot), his wife Janice Brown, and Bob Schulman, the latter two having worked at the original Frontier Airlines (1950–1986). In 1993, Continental Airlines was scaling back flights from Denver's Stapleton International Airport, and the three proposed a charter airline named AeroDenver Travel Services to fill demand on international routes, potentially in partnership with Condor Airlines. To run the company, they brought in M.C. "Hank" Lund (ex-CEO of the original Frontier Airlines) as CEO and Sam Addoms as executive vice-president and treasurer (later CEO). As Continental's Denver drawback expanded in scope in late 1993, the proposed airline pivoted to fill regional routes, and adopted the Frontier Airlines name. The company was incorporated in February and went public in May 1994.Scheduled flights began on July 5, 1994, using Boeing 737-200 jetliners between Denver and four cities in North Dakota. Around three-quarters of its 180 employees, and many executives, had worked for the original Frontier Airlines. By January 1995, Frontier had expanded its route network from Denver and was serving destinations in New Mexico, Montana, North Dakota, Texas, Nevada, Nebraska, and Arizona. Like the original airline of the same name, the new Frontier operated a hub at Denver (DEN) and for the first nine years used the slogan "The Spirit of the West" which was displayed above the windows and just behind the cursive letters "Frontier" on the fuselage of their aircraft.

In 1999, Frontier signed agreements to begin purchasing and leasing Airbus A318 and A319 jet aircraft and had also added Boeing 737-300 jetliners to its fleet as well. Also by September 1999, the airline was serving destinations from coast to coast in the U.S., having expanded its route network to include Atlanta (ATL); Baltimore (BWI); Bloomington/Normal, Illinois (BMI); Boston (BOS); Chicago (MDW, Midway Airport); Dallas/Fort Worth (DFW); Phoenix (PHX); Los Angeles (LAX); Minneapolis/St. Paul (MSP); New York City (LGA, LaGuardia Airport); Orlando (MCO); Portland, Oregon (PDX); Salt Lake City (SLC); San Diego (SAN); San Francisco (SFO); and Seattle (SEA), all served from its Denver hub.

2000s 

Frontier took delivery of its first Airbus aircraft (an A319) in 2001 and simultaneously launched with it DirecTV in-flight television along with a new company livery. Frontier Airlines was the launch customer of the Airbus A318 in 2003. In mid-April 2005, Frontier officially became an all-Airbus fleet, retiring its last Boeing 737. Jeff Potter was appointed CEO in 2002.

As part of its plan to stay competitive in reaction to the entry of Southwest Airlines into Denver, the company underwent a reorganization early in 2006. On April 3, 2006, Frontier created Frontier Airlines Holdings (FRNT), a holding company incorporated in Delaware to take advantage of favorable tax laws in that state. The corporate headquarters did not leave Colorado. In 2007, Frontier established a commuter airline subsidiary, Lynx Aviation, Inc., chaired by Dr. Paul Stephen Dempsey. Also that year, Jeff Potter left the company and was replaced by Air Canada's Sean Menke as CEO.

On January 24, 2007, Frontier was designated as a major carrier by the United States Department of Transportation.

On January 11, 2007, Frontier Airlines signed an 11-year service agreement with Republic Airways. Under the agreement, Republic was to operate 17, 76-seat Embraer 170 aircraft for the former Frontier JetExpress operations. At the time the contract was canceled in April 2008, Republic Airways operated 11 aircraft for Frontier Airlines, with the remaining six aircraft expected to join the fleet by December 2008. With the integration of Republic aircraft, the 'JetExpress' denotation was removed. Subsequent to the cessation of Horizon's services for Frontier in December 2007, all flights operated by Republic were sold and marketed as "Frontier Airlines, operated by Republic Airways." The first market created specifically for the Embraer 170 was Louisville, Kentucky, which began on April 1, 2007. Service to Louisville was suspended in August 2008 but restarted in April 2010.

Flights operated by Republic Airlines offered in-flight snack and beverage services similar to Frontier's mainline flights. Unlike Frontier's aircraft and due to the nature of contracting with regional carriers, these Embraer 170 aircraft were not fitted with LiveTV.

On April 10, 2008, Frontier filed for Chapter 11 bankruptcy in reaction to the intent of its credit card processor, First Data, to withhold significant proceeds from ticket sales. First Data decided that it would withhold 100% of the carrier's proceeds from ticket sales beginning May 1. According to Frontier's press release, "This change in practice would have represented a material change to our cash forecasts and business plan. Unchecked, it would have put severe restraints on Frontier's liquidity..." Its operation continued uninterrupted, though, as Chapter 11 bankruptcy protected the corporation's assets and allowed restructuring to ensure long-term viability. After months of losses, Frontier Airlines reported that they made their first profit during the month of November 2008, reporting  in net income for the month.

On June 22, 2009, Frontier Airlines announced that, pending bankruptcy court approval, Republic Airways Holdings, the Indianapolis-based parent company of Republic Airways, would acquire all assets of Frontier for the amount of $108 million. Thus, Frontier Airlines would become a wholly owned subsidiary of Republic. However, five weeks later on July 30, Dallas-based Southwest Airlines announced that it would be making a competing bid of $113.6 million for Frontier with intentions to also operate Frontier as a wholly owned subsidiary, but that it would gradually fold Frontier resources into current Southwest operating assets.

During a bankruptcy auction on August 13, 2009, Republic Airways Holdings acquired Frontier Airlines and its regional airline, Lynx Aviation, as wholly owned subsidiaries. On October 1, Republic completed the transaction, and Frontier officially exited bankruptcy as a new airline.

In late 2009, Republic began to consolidate administrative positions and moved 140 jobs from the Frontier Airlines Denver headquarters to Indianapolis. Shortly after in January 2010, Republic Airways announced that it would move all of its executives to Indianapolis. Later in February, the Denver Business Journal stated that the headquarters would be moved "soon". Despite this, according to the Denver Business Journal, Frontier Airlines will still maintain a local headquarters in Denver to house Training, Marketing, Customer Reservations, and Scheduling & Planning teams after extending its lease on the building through 2020.

In 2010, Frontier's then-CEO Bryan Bedford took part in the reality TV show Undercover Boss.

As Republic Airways Holdings was in the process of bidding to acquire Frontier in 2009, it was also in the process of acquiring Milwaukee-based Midwest Airlines. Through the fall and winter of 2009, Republic operated its two new acquisitions as separate brands. However, to improve efficiency by better matching aircraft capacity to route demand, Republic began to intermix the fleets of the two airlines, swapping a portion of its higher-capacity planes from Frontier with its smaller-capacity planes from Midwest and vice versa. However, the move caused some confusion amongst the public, as the two brands did not offer the same amenities and did not match the amenities mentioned on the airfare. As a result, in the Spring of 2010, Frontier and Midwest Airlines announced that their brands would merge, with Frontier being the surviving brand. This was a merger of brands only—no Midwest Airlines aircraft was ever operated by Frontier, as by this time, all Midwest Airlines flights were operated on its behalf by other Republic Airways Holdings subsidiaries.

On April 13, 2011, Frontier formed a new subsidiary, Frontier Express, that was planned to operate the airline's smaller aircraft with different services than those available on full-size aircraft.

2010s 

Upon the full merger and integration of Frontier and Midwest Airlines in October 2010, Frontier and its regional partners operated over 100 daily flights from the Milwaukee hub. However, on September 9, 2011, Frontier notified the public of a 40% reduction of arriving and departing flights from MKE. Along with this reduction of flights, the company laid off approximately 140 employees from the MKE station. This included but was not limited to: maintenance, grooming services, flight-line and gate.

In February 2012, Frontier Airlines further reduced service to Milwaukee by cutting five more nonstop routes. This move "reduced Frontier's daily departing flights out of Mitchell International from 32 to 18," or 56%. Frontier announced further layoffs in conjunction with this route change: up to 446 Milwaukee-area employees were affected by the job cuts that occurred between April 15 and 30, 2012.

In an effort to focus on regional contract flights for major carriers, Republic Airways Holdings announced in January 2012 its intention to sell or spin off Frontier. On January 26, 2012, Republic Airways Holdings appointed former US Airways and Gate Gourmet CEO David Siegel as president and CEO of Frontier Airlines. Republic also added new senior officers for Frontier's finance and commercial team, among other changes in the executive leadership team. Siegel and other Frontier executives moved to Denver where Frontier is headquartered in order to facilitate management of all aspects of Frontier during its separation process from Republic and continue its transformation into an ultra-low-cost carrier.

In November 2012, Frontier started low-frequency service between Orlando International Airport  and Trenton–Mercer Airport (TTN), located in Ewing, New Jersey, which at that time, had no commercial service. Frontier later expanded service several times from Trenton, and as of January 2023 services 9 destinations. Frontier currently bases three aircraft in Trenton. Trenton Mercer Airport lies roughly equidistant between Philadelphia International Airport and Newark Liberty International Airport.

In July 2013, Frontier started service from Wilmington-New Castle Airport (ILG) near Wilmington, Delaware, to five destinations, which Frontier markets as Wilmington/Philadelphia. Again, this airport had no commercial service prior to Frontier's entry. New Castle Airport lies roughly 30 miles southwest of Philadelphia International Airport and 75 miles northeast of Baltimore–Washington International Airport. As of 2022, Frontier does not serve ILG.

Frontier marketed both the Trenton-Mercer and Wilmington-Philadelphia airports as low-cost, low-hassle alternatives to the existing nearby commercial airports.
Frontier is the only commercial carrier at Trenton, and was the only carrier at ILG until it left in 2022.

In October 2013, Republic Airways Holdings entered into an agreement with private equity firm Indigo Partners to sell Frontier Airlines for approximately $145 million. According to Indigo, the transaction would further Frontier's evolution into an ultra-low-cost carrier. In December 2013, Indigo Partners LLC, through an affiliate, completed the purchase of Frontier Airlines from Republic Airways Holdings. The airline's headquarters remained in Denver. On January 1, 2014, Republic Airways Holdings subsidiary Republic Airlines ceased its operation of Embraer 190 aircraft on behalf of Frontier.In 2014, Frontier announced it would be transitioning into an ultra-low cost carrier. Frontier also announced that it would cut several flights and jobs at its Denver hub and transition them to different markets. On January 16, 2015, Frontier announced that it would close both its Denver and Milwaukee call centers, laying off 1,300 employees and outsourcing the jobs to call center company Sitel, which operates a large call center for Frontier in Las Cruces, New Mexico. Frontier Airlines joined Spirit and Allegiant in June 2015 by eradicating its toll-free telephone number for customer service.

In June 2014, Frontier Airlines opened a crew base for flight attendants at Trenton–Mercer Airport.

In January 2015, Frontier Airlines cut several flights from Wilmington and Trenton. It also resumed service to Philadelphia, casting doubt on the airline's existing bases. In late June 2015, Frontier announced it had ceased service in Wilmington, stating it was not profitable.

In February 2015, Frontier announced that they would begin service to several destinations from Atlanta, adding the airport as a focus city. In July, Frontier began to decrease service from Washington Dulles International Airport, removing the airport as a focus city. In early 2016, Frontier announced major route expansion from airports nationwide, including Atlanta, Chicago, Cincinnati, Cleveland, Orlando, and Philadelphia. In June 2016, Frontier re-established service to John Glenn Columbus International Airport. In May 2017, the airline announced it would open a new crew base in Las Vegas in fall 2017, to improve operational reliability and potentially create new jobs in Las Vegas. In December 2017, Frontier began service to Buffalo, New York, with service to Denver, Colorado, and Florida, including Miami, Fort Myers, Orlando, and Tampa.

In May 2015, Indigo and Frontier announced the departure of David Siegel as CEO. He had already previously turned over the role of president to Barry Biffle, formerly of Spirit Airlines. Siegel was not immediately replaced; instead, his duties were split between Biffle and Indigo chairman Bill Franke. Biffle cited operational issues in connection with Siegel's departure.

In 2015, in an airline quality rating report by Embry-Riddle Aeronautical University and Wichita State University, Frontier was ranked amongst the five worst airlines in the United States, especially due to its rate of customer complaints and bumped passengers. The airline had relatively poor on-time performance, and the waiting time for help when calling the airline on the phone was reported to have risen to two hours or more.

In December 2016, a winter weather event disrupted fleet operations and caused Frontier to delay or cancel up to 70% of their flights suddenly during the peak of the crisis. On the weekend of December 17, the storm caused major delays at Frontier's Denver hub. The effects of the storm were felt throughout the fleet. Flights were delayed or canceled at airports across the country; in some cases, planes were ready to depart, but the airline had no rested and available flight crews to service the flights. The head of Frontier's pilot's union issued a statement criticizing the companies' handling of the event, comparing the airline to a "house of cards."

2020s 

In 2020, class-action lawsuits against Frontier were filed after the company refused to refund airfare for customers who could not travel during the COVID-19 pandemic. The company accepted part of the $25 billion in U.S. government funds to offset financial damage to the airline industry during the outbreak.

On April 1, 2021, Frontier went public with an initial public offering on the Nasdaq exchange. The company adopted the ticker symbol ULCC, a nod to the company's ultra low-cost carrier business model.

In early 2022, Frontier attempted to acquire Spirit Airlines, another US-based ultra low-cost carrier in a  cash-and-stock deal. The deal would have created the fifth-largest airline in the country. On July 27, 2022, Spirit announced that its shareholders had rejected Frontier's offer.

In November 2022, Frontier announced that it will establish a crew operating base at Dallas Fort Worth International Airport (DFW) in early 2023, and will add a gate in DFW Terminal E for flights to additional destinations starting in April of that year. That month, it also eliminated its customer service phone line completely, referring customers to online modalities. Customers looking for information or help must now deal with an online chatbot, social media channels, or WhatsApp. Those wishing to speak with a live agent can use the carrier's 24/7 chat tool. "We have found that most customers prefer communicating via digital channels," spokesperson Jennifer F. de la Cruz said in a statement, saying they can now receive information as "expeditiously and efficiently as possible."

Corporate affairs

Business trends 
The key available trends for Frontier Group Holdings, Inc. over recent years are shown below (as at year ending December 31), although full annual accounts have not been published since Frontier has been owned by private equity firm, Indigo Partners.

Management changes 
Dave Siegel took the chief executive officer role in January 2012. Siegel's tenure ran through May 2015, when he left for personal reasons and was succeeded by the company's chairman, Bill Franke, who would manage strategy and finances. In April 2014, Barry L. Biffle was appointed as the company's president, reporting to Siegel; after Siegel's departure, Biffle was charged with managing the company's day-to-day operations.

Former regional carriers

Frontier JetExpress 
In February 2002, the airline launched its first regional product, Frontier JetExpress, initially operated by Mesa Airlines, using CRJ-200 regional jets. Similar to the "express" operations of other carriers, Frontier JetExpress was targeted for markets to and from Denver that do not generate traffic sufficient to support Frontier's smallest mainline jet, the Airbus A318, but could still offer lucrative business with a smaller jet.

The initial JetExpress partnership with Mesa ended in January 2004, when Horizon Air was selected to operate the routes. Horizon utilized slightly larger CRJ-700 regional jet aircraft on these routes. In August 2006, Frontier and Horizon planned to end their partnership. While Frontier was generally pleased with Horizon's operation, the carrier decided that it needed to revisit the agreement and find a provider with additional regional jets to grow the operation. The last of the CRJ-700s was returned to the Horizon Air fleet on November 30, 2007. As the service by Horizon Air was winding down in November 2007, Frontier had some flights operated by ExpressJet using Embraer-145 regional jets.

Lynx Aviation 
On September 6, 2006, Frontier created a new division of the holding company, known as Lynx Aviation, to operate Bombardier Q400 aircraft beginning in May 2007. On December 5, 2007, Lynx Aviation received its operating certificate from the FAA. Lynx began passenger operations on the morning of December 6, 2007.

After commencing operations, Lynx provided service to 19 regional destinations: Albuquerque, Aspen, Billings, Boise, Bozeman, Colorado Springs, Durango, El Paso, Fargo, Grand Junction, Hayden/Steamboat Springs (seasonal), Jackson Hole (Seasonal), Kansas City, Oklahoma City, Omaha, Rapid City, Salt Lake City, Tulsa, and Wichita. Most cities were also served by mainline Frontier jets however Lynx provided the only Frontier service to Aspen, Billings, Bozeman, Colorado Springs, Grand Junction, and Hayden.

In 2012, the Lynx Aviation operation was folded into Republic Airways Holdings' subsidiary, Republic Airways. The remaining Q400 aircraft were withdrawn from Frontier service and placed in service for United Airlines, flying as United Express.

Republic Airways 
Republic Airways operated Embraer 170 regional jets on behalf of Frontier in 2007 through mid-2008. Republic was also providing feeder service for Midwest Airlines and as Frontier and Midwest began merging in 2009, retaining the Frontier brand, Republic resumed service for Frontier with the Embraer 170s and also introduced larger Embraer 190 jets.

Chautauqua Airlines 
Chautauqua Airlines had been operating feeder flights on behalf of Midwest Airlines and began service for Frontier with the merger of Frontier and Midwest in October 2010. Chautauqua operated up to 12 Embraer 135 and Embraer 145 jets out of Milwaukee. Frontier began branding these flights as Frontier Express in the spring of 2011. New service began in 2011 on three subsidized Essential Air Service routes to the cities of Rhinelander, Wisconsin, as well as Ironwood and Manistee, Michigan. However, Frontier almost immediately began a pull-down of the Milwaukee hub and by the end of 2012, the only route that continued to operate with a Frontier Express ERJ-145 jet was Milwaukee to Rhinelander. Service to Rhinelander ended on January 3, 2013, and Chautauqua transferred the remaining aircraft to other partners.

Maverick Airways 
In 1997, Maverick Airways was operating codeshare service for Frontier with de Havilland Canada DHC-7 Dash 7 STOL capable turboprops between Denver (DEN) and two destinations in Colorado: Grand Junction (GJT) and Steamboat Springs (SBS).

Great Lakes Airlines 
Great Lakes Airlines also operated a codeshare service with Frontier from the early 2000s, until the airline shut down in 2018. Great Lakes provided connecting service to many smaller cities from the Denver hub, using Beechcraft 1900D and Embraer EMB 120 Brasilia aircraft.

Airline branding 
From 1994 to 2001, the airline's livery consisted of green script "Frontier" titles on the forward fuselage, a small "Spirit of the West" slogan, and wildlife photography on the tail of each aircraft. Most Boeing 737 aircraft featured different imagery on both sides.

Beginning in 2001, a new livery was introduced on the airline's new Airbus A319s, with large silver "FRONTIER" titles on the sides of the aircraft, and the airline's "Spirit of the West" slogan, later changed to "A whole different animal." The animal tails were retained, although only one image per aircraft was now used. Though the airline's Boeing 737s remained in the fleet until 2005, none were repainted into this livery.

In April 2013, Frontier introduced a modified version of that livery, keeping the iconic animals on aircraft tails, but dropping its former slogan and replacing "FRONTIER" with "FLYFRONTIER.COM", the company's website, in support of new marketing that focused heavily on the airline's web presence. This livery was only painted on a few newly delivered aircraft. Aircraft in the older livery received "FLYFRONTIER.COM" titles on engine nacelles.

On September 9, 2014, Frontier introduced an updated livery, as part of a rebranding that saw the spokesanimals' roles increase. The new livery reintroduced a green "FRONTIER" typeface to the fuselage, featuring the stylized "F" designed by Saul Bass for the original Frontier when the carrier unveiled a new livery in 1978. The livery of 2014 also includes the traditional arrow used by the original Frontier prior to 1978. Each aircraft features the name of the animal featured on its tail near the nose of the aircraft for easier identification.

Animal concepts used in the livery extend into Frontier's marketing as well. Each animal has a specific name. Animal aircraft used in their radio and television commercials include Jack the rabbit, Grizwald the bear, Foxy the fox (for whom Jack has a crush), Flip the dolphin (who always gets stuck going to Chicago rather than the warmer climates the others are going to), Larry the lynx, Hector the sea otter, and Sal the cougar. New additions are Penguins Jim, Joe, Jay, and Gary, a barbershop-style quartet, singing the praises of EarlyReturns to an audience of Frontier's well-known characters from the "a whole different animal" campaign, Hector the otter, advertising Frontier's expanding service to Mexico, and Polly the Parrot, who won the new animal audition in 2012.

Expanding on these concepts in 2023, Frontier introduced a new approach with their animal mascots taking on promiscuous roles in a calendar titled "Fur & Feathers". This calendar was emailed to Frontier's database of travelers, encouraging them to download and display the characters at work. The initiative ultimately backfired on the airline, as users across social media discussed their discomfort around the campaign.

Destinations 

Frontier Airlines currently flies to 115 destinations throughout the United States, El Salvador, Mexico, Guatemala, Puerto Rico, the Dominican Republic and Costa Rica.

Fleet

Current fleet 

, Frontier Airlines operates an all-Airbus A320ceo and A320neo family fleet composed of the following aircraft:

Fleet development 
During the 2011 Paris Air Show, Republic Airways Holdings ordered 60 A320neo aircraft and 20 A319neo aircraft for Frontier. In 2014, the airline ordered 19 Airbus A321neos. In October 2016, Frontier Airlines took delivery of its first Airbus A320neo aircraft and became the second US operator of the type after Spirit Airlines.

On November 15, 2017, Frontier Airlines announced a $15 billion order for 134 additional A320neo family aircraft. The order, slightly revised under new owner Indigo, consisted of 100 A320neos and 34 A321neos. The order also included the conversion of the remaining A319neo to A320neo. With this order, Frontier Airlines fleet sought industry-leading fuel efficiency as well as one of the youngest and most modern fleets, particularly in comparison to other low-cost carriers, with an average fleet age of five years .

Historical fleet 

Frontier Airlines has operated the following aircraft types:

Frontier was the launch customer of the Airbus A318; between 2003 and 2007, the airline took delivery of eleven of the type. Retirement of the type began in 2010 and was completed by autumn 2013. All of Frontier's A318 were parted out for scrap. At the time, the five youngest examples had spent less than two and a half years in active service, while the oldest two were just over ten years old.

Services

In-flight services
At 19″ wide, the middle seats in the airline's Airbus 321s and A320s are wider than the window and aisle seats and, as of July 2015 when the airline began installing them, are the widest middle seats of any airline in the U.S. The A321ceo and A321neo, utilized on longer flights, features industry-standard seat pitch of 30"-32". The airline uses a seat pitch of only 28″-29", the tightest seat pitch of any airline in the United States, on their A320ceo and A320neo, typically operated on shorter flights. Main cabin seats are "pre-reclined" by the airline and there are no televisions mounted at any of the seats in order to save weight.

"Stretch" row seating, available for an additional fee or complimentary for Frontier Elite Program members, features an extra 5-8" pitch, full-reclining seat, lumbar support and diamond stitching.

Frequent-flyer program 
Frontier Miles is the frequent-flyer program for Frontier Airlines, replacing the EarlyReturns program, which existed from 2003 to 2018. Frontier Miles can be earned by flying Frontier Airlines, using the Frontier Airlines World MasterCard, or by spending at partner hotels, car rental chains, cruises, and merchants. Frontier Miles can be redeemed for flights, magazine subscriptions, car rentals and hotel stays.

Frontier has a three-tier frequent flyer status program. The tiers are Elite 20K (earned by flying 20,000 Status Qualifying Miles [SQM] or 25 segments in a calendar year), Elite 50K (50,000 SQM or 50 segments), and Elite 100K (100,000 SQM or 100 segments). Elite benefits include free carry-on and checked bags, advance seat assignment and family seating, priority boarding, redemption fee waiver, stretch seating, Discount Den membership, and mileage multipliers.

Accidents and incidents 

 On November 30, 2018, a Frontier Airlines Airbus A320-200, (registered N227FR) operating as Frontier Airlines Flight 260, had its engine fan cowlings ripped off during take-off. The crew stated that a foreign object on the runway may have caused it. Although this did not interfere with the aircraft's engine functionality, the crew decided to perform an emergency landing anyway before the situation got worse. No one aboard was injured.
 On August 8, 2019, a Frontier Airlines Airbus A321-200 (registered N717FR) operating as Frontier Airlines Flight 1187 suffered a tailstrike during landing. The aircraft was repaired and no one was injured.

See also 
 List of Colorado companies
 Air transportation in the United States

Notes

References

External links 

 
  (earliest archives are at flyfrontier.com)
 Route Network
 Frontier Airlines Fleet Photos and Tail Closeups

1994 establishments in Colorado
American companies established in 1994
Airlines established in 1994
Airlines based in Colorado
Companies based in Denver
Companies listed on the Nasdaq
Companies that filed for Chapter 11 bankruptcy in 2008
Republic Airways
Low-cost carriers
2021 initial public offerings